A technological fix, technical fix, technological shortcut or (techno-)solutionism refers to attempts to use engineering or technology to solve a problem (often created by earlier technological interventions).

Some references define technological fix as an "attempt to repair the harm of a technology by modification of the system", that might involve modification of the machine and/or modification of the procedures for operating and maintaining it.

Technological fixes are inevitable in modern technology. It has been observed that many technologies, although invented and developed to solve certain perceived problems, often create other problems in the process, known as externalities. In other words, there would be modification of the basic hardware, modification of techniques and procedures, or both.

The technological fix is the idea that all problems can find solutions in better and new technologies. It now is used as a dismissive phrase to describe cheap, quick fixes by using inappropriate technologies; these fixes often create more problems than they solve, or give people a sense that they have solved the problem.

Contemporary context
In the contemporary context, technological fix is sometimes used to refer to the idea of using data and intelligent algorithms to supplement and improve human decision making in hope that this would result in ameliorating the bigger problem. One critic, Evgeny Morozov defines this as "Recasting all complex social situations either as neat problems with definite, computable solutions or as transparent and self-evident processes that can be easily optimized – if only the right algorithms are in place." While some criticizes this approach to the issues of today as detrimental to efforts to truly solve these problems, opponents finds merits in such approach to technological improvement of our society as complements to existing activists and policy efforts.

An example of the criticism is how policy makers may be tempted to think that installing smart energy monitors would help people conserve energy better, thus improving global warming, rather than focusing on the arduous process of passing laws to tax carbon, etc. Another example is thinking of obesity as a lifestyle choice of eating high caloric foods and not exercising enough, rather than viewing obesity as more of a social and class problem where individuals are predisposed to eat certain kind of foods (due to the lack of affordable health-supporting food in urban food deserts), to lack optimally evidence-based health behaviors, and lack of proper health care to mitigate behavioral outcomes.

Algorithms 
The definition of algorithms according to the Oxford Languages dictionary is “a process or set of rules to be followed in calculations or other problem-solving operations, especially by a computer.” Algorithms are increasingly used as technological fixes in modern society to replace tasks or decision-making by humans, often to reduce labor costs, increase efficiency, or reduce human bias. These solutions serve as a “quick and flawless way to solve complex real world problems… but technology isn’t magic”. The use of algorithms as fixes, however, are not addressing the root causes of these problems. Instead, algorithms are more often being used as “band-aid” solutions that may provide temporary relief, but do not ameliorate the issue for good. Additionally, these fixes tend to come with their own problems, some of which are even more harmful than the original problem.

One example of algorithms as a technological fix for increasing public safety is face recognition software, which has been used by the San Diego County police department  and the Pittsburgh police department, among other government security organizations. Face recognition is an example of algorithmic technology that is viewed as potentially having many benefits for its users, such as verifying one’s identity in security systems. This system uses biometrics to quantify and map out distinguishing facial features. However, face recognition as a technological fix for safety and security concerns comes with issues of privacy and discrimination. In the case of face recognition technology being used by the San Diego County police department, Black men were being falsely accused of crimes due to being mistakenly identified by the software. Additionally, San Diego police used the face recognition software on African Americans up to twice as often than on other people. The cases of discrimination perpetuated by the face recognition tool led to a three-year ban on its use starting in 2019. Instead of addressing systemic and historically embedded issues of inequalities among racial groups, the face recognition technology was used to perpetuate discrimination and support police in doing their jobs unfairly and inaccurately.

Another example of algorithms being used as a technological fix is tools to automate decision-making, such as in the cases of Oregon’s Child Welfare Risk Tool  and the Pittsburgh Allegheny County Family Screening Tool (AFST). In these cases, algorithms replacing humans as decision makers have been used to fix the underlying issues of the cost of employees to make child welfare case decisions and to eliminate human biases in the decision-making process. However, researchers at Carnegie Mellon University found that the tool discriminates against Black families, who are statistically underserved and have historically lived in lower-income areas. This historical data caused by systemic disparities causes the algorithm to flag a greater percentage of children of Black families as high risk than children of White families. By using data based on historical biases, the automated decisions further fuel racial disparities, and actually accomplish the opposite of the intended outcomes.

Climate change 
The technological fix for climate change is an example of the use of technology to restore the environment. This can be seen through various different strategies such as: geo-engineering and renewable energy.

Geo-engineering 
Geo-engineering is referred as "the artificial modification of Earth's climate systems through two primary ideologies: Solar Radiation Management (SRM) and Carbon Dioxide Removal (CDR)".  Different schemes, projects and technologies have been designed to tackle the effects of climate change, usually by removing  from the air as seen by Klaus Lackner's invention of a  prototype, or by limiting the amount of sunlight that reaches the Earth's surface, by space mirrors. However, "critics by contrast claim that geoengineering isn't realistic – and may be a distraction from reducing emissions." It has been argued that geo-engineering is an adaptation to global warming. It allows TNC's, humans and governments to avoid facing the facts that global warming is a crisis that needs to be dealt with head-on by reducing emissions and implementing green technologies, rather than developing ways to control the environment and ultimately allow Greenhouse Gases to continue to be released into the atmosphere.

Renewable energy 

Renewable energy is also another example of a technological fix. These technologies seek to reduce greenhouse gas emissions in energy production, directly releasing little to no emissions.[source?] They are generally regarded as infinite energy sources, which means they will never run out, unlike fossil fuels such as oil and coal, which are finite sources of energy. Examples of renewable energy can be seen by wind turbines, solar energy such as solar panels and kinetic energy from waves. Renewable energy is regarded as a technological fix to energy insecurity, providing alternatives to fossil fuels. It is also known that such technologies will in turn require their own technological fixes. For example, some types of solar energy have local impacts on ambient temperature, which can be a hazard to birdlife.

Food famine 
It has been made explicit within society that the world's population is rapidly increasing, with the  "UNICEF estimating that an average of 353,000 babies are born each day around the world." Therefore, it is expected that the production of food will not be able to progress and develop to keep up with the needs of species. Ester Boserup highlighted in 1965 that when the human population increases and food production decreases, an innovation will take place. This can be demonstrated in the technological development of hydroponics and genetically modified crops.

Hydroponics 
Hydroponics is an example of a technological fix. It demonstrates the ability for humans to recognise a problem within society, such as the lack of food for an increasing population, and therefore attempt to fix this problem with the development of an innovative technology. Hydroponics is a method of food production to increase productivity, in an "artificial environment." The soil is replaced by a mineral solution that is left around the plant roots. Removing the soil allows a greater crop yield, as there is less chance of soil-borne diseases, as well as being able to monitor plant growth and mineral concentrations.  This innovative technology to yield more food reflects the ability for humans to develop their way out of a problem, portraying a technological fix.

Genetically modified organism 
Genetically modified organism (GMO) reflect the use of technology to innovate our way out of a problem such as the lack of food to cater for the growing population, demonstrating a technological fix. GM crops can create many advantages, such as higher food fields, added vitamins and increased farm profits. Depending on the modifications, they may also introduce the problem of increasing resistance to pesticides and herbicides, which may inevitably precipitate the need for further fixes in the future.

Golden rice 
Golden rice is one example of a technological fix. It demonstrates the ability for humans to develop and innovate themselves out of problems, such as the deficiency of vitamin A in Taiwan and Philippines, in which the World Health Organization reported that about 250 million preschool children are affected by. Through the technological development of GM Crops, scientists were able to develop golden rice that can be grown in these countries with genetically higher levels of beta-carotene (a precursor of vitamin A). This enables healthier and fulfilling lifestyles for these individuals and consequently helps to reduce the deaths caused by the deficiency.

Externalities 
Externalities refer to the unforeseen or unintended consequences of technology. It is evident that everything new and innovative can potentially have negative effects, especially if it is a new area of development. Although technologies are invented and developed to solve certain perceived problems, they often create other problems in the process.

Algorithms 
Evgeny Morozov, writer and researcher on social implications of technology, has said, “A new problem-solving infrastructure is new; new types of solutions become possible that weren’t possible 15 years ago”. The issue with the use of algorithms as technological fixes is that they shouldn’t be applied as a one-size-fits-all solution because each problem comes with its own context and implications. While algorithms can offer solutions, it can also amplify discriminatory harms, especially to already marginalized groups. These externalities include racial bias, gender bias, and disability discrimination.

Oftentimes, algorithms are implemented into systems without a clear understanding of whether or not it is an appropriate solution to a problem. In Understanding perception of algorithmic decisions: Fairness, trust, and emotion in response to algorithmic management, Min Kyung Lee writes, “...the problem is that industries often incorporate technology whose performance and effectiveness are not yet proven, without careful validation and reflection.” Algorithms may offer immediate relief to problems or an optimistic outlook to the current issues at hand, but they can also create more problems that require even more complex solutions. Sometimes, the use of algorithms as a technological fix leaves us asking, “Did anyone ask for this?” and wondering whether the benefits outweigh the harms. These tradeoffs should be rigorously assessed in order to determine if an algorithm is truly the most appropriate solution.

DDT 
DDT was initially use by the Military in World War II to control a range of different illnesses, varying from Malaria to the bubonic plague and body lice.  Due to the efficiency of DDT, it was soon adopted as a farm pesticide to help maximise crop yields to consequently cope with the rising populations food demands post WWII. This pesticide proved to be extremely effective in killing bugs and animals on crops, and was often referred as the "wonder-chemical".  However, despite being banned for over forty years, we are still facing the externalities of this technology. It was found that DDT had major health impacts on both humans and animals. It was found that DDT accumulated within the fatty cells of both humans and animals and therefore highlights that technological fixes have their negatives as well as positives.

Humans 
 Breast & other cancers
 Male infertility
 Miscarriages & low birth weight
 Developmental delay
 Nervous system & liver damage

Animals 
 DDT is toxic to birds when eaten.
 Decreases the reproductive rate of birds by causing eggshell thinning and embryo deaths.
 Highly toxic to aquatic animals. DDT affects various systems in aquatic animals including the heart and brain.
 DDT moderately toxic to amphibians like frogs, toads, and salamanders. Immature amphibians are more sensitive to the effects of DDT than adults.

Global warming 

Global warming can be a natural phenomenon that occurs in long (geologic) cycles. However, it has been found that the release of greenhouse gases through industry and traffic causes the earth to warm. This is causing externalities on the environment, such as melting icecaps, shifting biomes, and extinction of many aquatic species through ocean acidification and changing ocean temperatures.

Automobiles 
Automobiles with internal combustion engines have revolutionised civilisation and technology. However, whilst the technology was new and innovative, helping to connect places through the ability of transport, it was not recognised at the time that burning fossil fuels, such as coal and oil, inside the engines would release pollutants. This is an explicit example of an externality caused by a technological fix, as the problems caused from the development of the technology was not recognised at the time.

Different types of technological fixes

High-tech megaprojects 
High-tech megaprojects are large scale and require huge sums of investment and revenue to be created. Examples of these high technologies are dams, nuclear power plants, and airports. They usually cause externalities on other factors such as the environment, are highly expensive, and are top-down governmental plans.

Three Gorges Dam 
The Three Gorges Dam is an example of a high-tech technological fix. The creation of the multi-purpose navigation hydropower and flood control scheme was designed to fix the issues with flooding whilst providing efficient, clean renewable hydro-electric power in China. The Three Gorges Dam is the world's largest power station in terms of installed capacity (22,500 MW). The dam is the largest operating hydroelectric facility in terms of annual energy generation, generating 83.7 TWh in 2013 and 98.8 TWh in 2014, while the annual energy generation of the Itaipú Dam  in Brazil and Paraguay was 98.6 TWh in 2013 and 87.8 in 2014. It was estimated to have cost over £25 billion.  There have been many externalities from this technology, such as the extinction of the Chinese River Dolphin, an increase in pollution, as the river can no longer 'flush' itself, and over 4 million locals being displaced in the area.

Intermediate technology 

Is usually small-scale and cheap technologies that are usually seen in developing countries. The capital to build and create these technologies are usually low, yet labour is high. Local expertise can be used to maintain these technologies making them very quick and effective to build and repair. An example of an intermediate technology can be seen by water wells, rain barrels and pumpkin tanks.

Appropriate technologies 

Technology that suits the level of income, skills and needs of the people. Therefore, this factor encompasses both high and low technologies.

An example of this can be seen by developing countries that implement technologies that suit their expertise, such as rain barrels and hand pumps. These technologies are low costing and can be maintained by local skills, making them affordable and efficient. However, to implement rain barrels in a developed country would not be appropriate, as it would not suit the technological advancement apparent in these countries. Therefore,  appropriate technological fixes take into consideration the level of development within a country before implementing them.

Concerns
Michael and Joyce Huesemann caution against the hubris of large-scale techno-fixes In the book Techno-Fix: Why Technology Won't Save Us Or the Environment they show why negative unintended consequences of science and technology are inherently unavoidable and unpredictable, why counter-technologies or techno-fixes are no lasting solutions, and why modern technology in current context does not promote sustainability but instead collapse.

Naomi Klein is a prominent opponent of the view that simply technological fixes will solve our problems. She explained her concerns in her book This Changes Everything: Capitalism vs. the Climate and states that technical fixes for climate change such as geoengineering bring significant risks as "we simply don't know enough about the Earth system to be able to re-engineer it safely". According to her the proposed technique of dimming the rays of the sun with sulphate-spraying helium balloons in order to mimic the cooling effect on the atmosphere of large volcanic eruptions for instance is highly dangerous and such schemes will surely be attempted if abrupt climate change gets seriously under way. Such concerns are explored in their complexity in Elizabeth Kolbert's Under a White Sky.

Various experts and environmental groups have also come forward with their concerns over views and approaches that look for techno fixes as solutions and warn that those would be "misguided, unjust, profoundly arrogant and endlessly dangerous" approaches as well as over the prospect of a technological 'fix' for global warming, however impractical, causing lessened political pressure for a real solution.

See also 
 Attitudinal fix
 Structural fix
 Differential technological development
 Law of Unintended Consequences
 Philosophy of technology
 Social engineering (political science)
 Technocentrism

References

Technology in society
Problem solving methods